The 1958 Volta a Catalunya was the 38th edition of the Volta a Catalunya cycle race and was held from 7 September to 14 September 1958. The race started in Montjuïc and finished in Barcelona. The race was won by Richard Van Genechten.

General classification

References

1958
Volta
Volta a Catalunya
Volta a Catalunya